Overall, seventeen players have represented the Scottish national women's cricket team in One Day International (ODI) cricket. Scotland made its ODI debut at the 2001 edition of the European Championship, becoming the sixteenth team to appear at that level. The team also played ODIs at the 2003 IWCC Trophy (now called the World Cup Qualifier), but at its next major international tournament, the 2005 European Championship, Scotland lost its ODI status, which it is yet to regain. In total, Scotland played eight ODI matches between 2001 and 2003, winning only a single match – against Japan in 2003. Only three Scotswomen participated in all eight of their team's games at ODI level – Kari Anderson, Fiona Urquhart, and Kathryn White.

Key

List of players

Last updated 20 November 2015. This list includes all players who have played at least one ODI match and is initially arranged in the order of debut appearance. Where more than one player won their first cap in the same match, those players are initially listed alphabetically at the time of debut.

References 

Scotland

Women ODI
Cricket